The siege of Capua was a military operation involving the states of medieval southern Italy, beginning in May 1098 and lasting forty days.  It was an interesting siege historically for the assemblage of great persons it saw and militarily for the cooperation of Norman and Saracen forces which it necessitated.

The siege
The siege was instigated by Richard II, prince of Capua, who had been exiled from his own capital for seven years (1091–1098) by Lando IV until, reaching his majority, he requested the aid of his great uncle, the count of Sicily, Roger I, and his first cousin once removed, the duke of Apulia, Roger Borsa. The two Rogers came, the former in exchange for the city of Naples and the latter for Richard's recognition of Apulian suzerainty.

Roger of Sicily had lately arrested Robert, bishop of Troina and Messina, whom Pope Urban II had given the legateship of Sicily, though Roger himself was holding it.  Embroiled in such controversy, the pope came down to discuss it with Roger, who released Robert.  The pope's presence caused the saintly archbishop of Canterbury, a Lombard, Anselm of Aosta, then in self-exile from King William II of England, to go to meet the pope.  According to Eadmer, Anselm's biographer, "the Lord Pope and Anselm were neighbours at the siege."

Eadmer also gives us an interesting portrait of the Arabs, whose brown tents Anselm found "innumerable." According to Eadmer, many Arabs, impressed by tales of Anselm's holiness, visited his tent for food and other gifts.  The biographer goes on to say that the count, whose soldiers the Saracens were, would not allow them, though many would readily have done so, to convert to the Roman Catholic faith. "With what policy—if one can use that word—he did this, is no concern of mine: that is between God and himself."  The policy, so inconceivable to Eadmer, is probably explained in this way: by maintaining a third religious and cultural party (other than Latin or Greek Christian) on the island, he assured that he could always have an ally, should either Muslim or Greek oppose him, a Latin.  It also assured the presence of an "outlet for the military instincts and talents of his Muslim subjects," according to historian John Julius Norwich.

Aftermath
When the city surrendered, Richard was reinstated, Roger Borsa accepted his homage, and the pope and Roger of Sicily retired to Salerno.

Sources
Southern, R. W. Saint Anselm and His Biographer. Cambridge, 1963.
Norwich, John Julius. The Normans in the South 1016-1130. Longmans: London, 1967.

Capua 1098
Capua
Capua 1098
11th century in Italy
Capua
1098 in Europe